James Carter Tessier (1842 – 1900) was an English-born merchant and politician in Newfoundland. He represented St. John's West in the Newfoundland House of Assembly from 1893 to 1894 and from 1897 to 1900 as a Liberal.

The son of Peter G. Tessier and Jane Carter, who was the daughter of Robert Carter, he was born in London and came to Newfoundland in 1853. He worked in the family fishery supply business before establishing a fish exporting business in partnership with Robert Thorburn. The business was forced to close following the 1894 Bank Crash. Tessier was unseated in 1894 after his election was appealed but was reelected in 1897.

He was married twice: first to Ann Jackman Langmead and then to Julia Ann Trotman.

References 

Members of the Newfoundland and Labrador House of Assembly
1842 births
1900 deaths
English emigrants to pre-Confederation Newfoundland
Newfoundland Colony people